Recurring Dream may refer to:
"The Reoccurring Dream", a song by Joni Mitchell from her 1988 album Chalk Mark in a Rainstorm
"Reoccurring Dreams", a song by Hüsker Dü from their 1984 album Zen Arcade 
"Dreams Reoccurring", a song by Hüsker Dü from their 1984 album Zen Arcade